Svenska Serien 1920–21, part of the 1920–21 Swedish football season, was the eighth Svenska Serien season played and the first since 1917. Örgryte IS won the league ahead of runners-up GAIS.

League table

References 

Print

Online

1920-21
Sweden
1